Belfast was an Irish borough constituency in the House of Commons of the United Kingdom of Great Britain and Ireland. Comprising the city of Belfast, it elected one Member of Parliament (MP) from 1801 to 1832, and then two MPs from 1832 until the constituency was divided by the Redistribution of Seats Act 1885 for the 1885 general election.

Summary

Representation
Under the Act of Union 1800 the Parliament of Ireland was merged with the Parliament of Great Britain to form the Parliament of the United Kingdom. The 300 members of the Irish House of Commons were reduced to 100 Irish members of the United Kingdom House of Commons. As part of that process Belfast lost one of its seats.

There was no new election for the 1st Parliament of the United Kingdom. In Irish constituencies where the number of seats were reduced from two to one, the MP selected to attend Westminster was selected by drawing lots.

Boundaries and boundary changes
This constituency was the parliamentary borough of Belfast in County Antrim. In 1832 and 1868 the boundaries of that borough were extended.

1832 boundaries
The boundaries were defined by the Parliamentary Boundaries (Ireland) Act 1832 as:

1868 boundaries
The Representation of the People (Ireland) Act 1868, provided that all that part of the borough situate beyond the limits of the parliamentary borough as defined in 1832, but within the municipal limits, should form part of the borough for all purposes connected with the election of a member or members to serve in parliament for the borough. See Belfast Borough Extension Act 1853 (16 & 17 Vict.) c. 129, which defined the boundaries of the borough as follows:

The boundary is shown as 'Municipal Boundary' on the second edition of the Ordnance Survey maps of Ireland.

1885 division
In the redistribution of 1885 Belfast was further expanded (including parts of County Down as well as County Antrim) and split into four single member divisions; Belfast East, Belfast North, Belfast South and Belfast West.

Electoral system and electorate
The parliamentary representatives of the borough were elected using the bloc vote for two-member elections and first past the post for single-member ones.

Until 1832 the electorate were the members of Belfast Corporation (the local Council). This had long been resented by reformers as it made the constituency a pocket borough of the Marquess of Donegall.

In 1784 a petition was sent to the Parliament of Ireland.

In such circumstances it is hardly surprising that there were no contested elections, for the United Kingdom Parliament, in the constituency until reform took place.

In 1832 the electorate was considerably extended by the Representation of the People (Ireland) Act 1832. Boroughs in Ireland were given a uniform franchise for the first time. The vote was given to occupiers of land valued at least £10 and resident freemen by birth or servitude (descent from or apprenticeship to an existing freeman of the borough) or who were admitted before March 1831.

Members of Parliament

Notes: 
 (1) Lord Arthur Chichester and James Emerson Tennent changed party allegiance in 1834 (from Liberal to Conservative).
 (2) Lord John Ludford Chichester changed party allegiance by 1847 (part of Peelite faction).

Elections
After 1832, when registration of voters was introduced, a turnout figure is given for contested elections. In two-member elections (when the exact number of voters is unknown) this is calculated by dividing the number of votes by two. To the extent that voters did not use both their votes this will be an underestimate of turnout. If the electorate figure is unknown the last known electorate figure is used to provide an estimate of turnout.

Where a party had more than one candidate in one or both of a pair of successive elections change is calculated for each individual candidate, otherwise change is based on the party vote.

Elections in the 1800s

Elections in the 1810s

 Death of May

 Appointment of May as Collector of Customs in Belfast Port

Elections in the 1820s

Elections in the 1830s

 J. Emerson Tennent ceased to support Lord Grey in 1834 (see Emerson Tennent's article in The Oxford Dictionary of National Biography).

Note: Stooks Smith suggests there were 1,451 registered electors. Walker gives the electorate figure as above.

 Death of McCance

Note: Stooks Smith suggests there were 1,508 registered electors. Walker gives the electorate figure as above. Stooks Smith also indicates that 'Mr Tennent resigned in consequence of a decision of the Assessors'.

Stooks Smith suggests there were 1,926 registered electors. Walker gives the electorate figure as above.

 8 March 1838: On petition Gibson and the Earl of Belfast were unseated and Emerson Tennent and Dunbar declared elected

Elections in the 1840s

 

Note: 1,740 electors voted. Stooks Smith suggests there were 1,937 registered electors. Walker gives the electorate figure as above.

 On petition Emerson Tennent and Johnson unseated and new writ issued

 

Note: Stooks Smith comments that 'a compromise was entered into by which one of each party was to be returned'.

 Resignation of Emerson Tennent

Elections in the 1850s

 

 
 

 Appointment of Cairns as Solicitor-General

Elections in the 1860s
 Resignation of Davison

 

 Appointment of Cairns as Attorney-General

 Appointment of Cairns as Lord Justice of Appeal in Chancery (of England and Wales)

Elections in the 1870s

 

 

 Appointment of Johnston as Inspector of Fisheries

Elections in the 1880s

 Constituency divided in the 1885 redistribution

See also
 List of Irish constituencies
 List of UK Parliament Constituencies in Ireland and Northern Ireland

References

The Parliaments of England by Henry Stooks Smith (1st edition published in three volumes 1844–50), 2nd edition edited (in one volume) by F. W. S. Craig (Political Reference Publications 1973)
Parliamentary Election Results in Ireland, 1801-1922, edited by B. M. Walker (Royal Irish Academy 1978)

External links
 Peter Robinson, the former MP for the constituency, provided details on his web-site of the Parliamentary boundaries and electoral history of Belfast since the Union and provided brief biographies of Belfast MPs. The report of the Boundary Commission (Ireland) (Cd 8830, 1917), which is referred to on that website, is available online here.

Historic Westminster constituencies in Belfast
Constituencies of the Parliament of the United Kingdom established in 1801